Libomyšl is a municipality and village in Beroun District in the Central Bohemian Region of the Czech Republic. It has about 600 inhabitants.

Administrative parts
The village of Želkovice is an administrative part of Libomyšl.

Geography
It lies on the Litavka river in the Hořovice Uplands.

History
The first written mention of Libomyšl is from 1370.

References

Villages in the Beroun District